Elto or ELTO may refer to:

People
 Max Elto, Swedish vocal duo

Places
 Monte Elto, Italy

Other
 ELTO, American engine manufacturer